Xiphophorus multilineatus is a fish in the family Poeciliidae. It is endemic to a small part of the Pánuco River basin in Mexican.

References

multilineatus
Taxa named by Mary Rauchenberger
Taxa named by Klaus D. Kallman
Taxa named by Donald Charles Morizot
Fish described in 1990